George Harold Van Allen  (June 22, 1890 – June 15, 1937) was a Canadian provincial politician from Alberta. He served as a member of the Legislative Assembly of Alberta from 1935 to his death in 1937, sitting with the Liberal caucus in government.

Early life
George Harold Van Allen was born June 22, 1890 at Crysler's Farm in Morrisburg, Ontario to Wilbur Van Allen and Florence Louise Hayunga, both Canadian ancestors of United Empire Loyalists. Van Allen attended Morrisburg High School and was educated to become a teacher. He moved to Lethbridge in 1912 to become a principal, and soon after relocated to Edmonton to attend the University of Alberta where he completed his Bachelor of Laws. Van Allen was admitted to the bar in 1915, formed his own practice in 1919 and was named King's Counsel in 1929. He married Ruby Thomer on December 23, 1926 and together had three sons and one daughter. Van Allen served as government counsel during the Royal Commission on Grain Freight Rates in 1923–1924, and as the President of the Edmonton Chamber of Commerce in 1928-1929.

Political life
George Van Allen was elected to the 8th Alberta Legislature in the district of Edmonton in the 1935 Alberta general election. Van Allen was one of six candidates elected for the district, which included two other Liberals in William R. Howson and Gerald O'Connor. As an MLA, Van Allen focused his attention on the state of the agricultural industry and was concerned with the Social Credit economic policies. Van Allen contracted the flu in the autumn of 1936 that developed into pneumonia. He sought treatment in California and Minnesota until his death at the Mayo Clinic in Rochester, Minnesota part way through his term in office on June 15, 1937 at the age of 46.

References

External links

Alberta Liberal Party MLAs
University of Alberta Faculty of Law alumni
Politicians from Edmonton
Canadian King's Counsel
1937 deaths
1890 births
People from the United Counties of Stormont, Dundas and Glengarry